Htet Htet Htun (born 20 June 1992) is a Burmese actress, TV Host, model and beauty pageant titleholder who was crowned Miss Universe Myanmar 2016 and represented Myanmar at the Miss Universe 2016 Pageant.

Education
Htet holds a B.Tech in Civil Engineering. She currently works as an actress and model in Myanmar.

Pageantry

Miss Universe Myanmar 2016
Htet previously competed at the Miss Myanmar World 2014 and placed as Second Runner-up. On October 3, 2015 at the Miss Universe Myanmar 2015–16, Htet crowned Miss Universe Myanmar 2016 together with Miss Universe Myanmar 2015, May Barani Thaw. The organization held the format for the first time in history of Miss Myanmar.

Miss Universe 2016
Htet represented Myanmar and won the award for Best in National Costume at Miss Universe 2016 where Pia Wurtzbach of the Philippines crowned Iris Mittenaere of France at the end of the event.

Filmography

Film (Cinema)
Nyit Toon (2019)

Television series
Charm (2016)
A Kyin Nar Myit Phyar (2019)

References

External links
Miss Universe Myanmar

Living people
Burmese beauty pageant winners
1992 births
People from Yangon
Burmese female models
Miss Universe 2016 contestants
Miss Universe Myanmar winners